Enrico Falck was an Italian entrepreneur, member of the board of directors of the Falck Industries. He joined the Italian Christian Democracy, and was an Italian Senator from Lombardy.

Political career

In 1934 Falck was named by king Vittorio Emanuele III senator of the kingdom. In 1945 he was expelled from the upper house due his involvement with fascism.
Falck Industries, based in Sesto San Giovanni, was a leader of iron and steel manufacturing, and Enrico was nominated for the Senate by the DC. He did not seek re-election in 1953, to follow his private interests.

See also
Italian Senate election in Lombardy, 1948

Footnotes

External links

Site

1899 births
Members of the Italian Senate from Lombardy
Christian Democracy (Italy) politicians
20th-century Italian politicians
Members of the Senate of the Republic (Italy)
Year of death missing
Members of the Senate of the Kingdom of Italy